The walrus moustache  is characterized by whiskers that are thick, bushy, and drop over the mouth.  The style resembles the whiskers of a walrus, hence the name.

History 

Reportedly an ethnic trait of Celts and Gauls, the walrus moustache enjoyed immense popularity among men in the latter part of the 19th and early years of the 20th centuries. Gentlemen ranging from scientists to philosophers to politicians often favored the rugged look that the style created.

After falling out of favor in the 1920s it enjoyed a temporary resurgence during the youth counterculture revolution of the 1960s.

Styles 
In some instances, the facial hair of the walrus moustache not only drops over the mouth but also extends downward at each corner. The hairline may wrap around the cheeks and connect to sideburns the same thickness, as worn by the man they are named for, Ambrose Burnside.

Many men throughout history have sported a walrus moustache. In Germany, the walrus is commonly associated with Reichskanzler Otto von Bismarck. Other men include actor Wilford Brimley, Kansas City Chiefs coach Andy Reid, American president Theodore Roosevelt, former United States National Security Advisor and United States Ambassador to the United Nations John Bolton, American author Mark Twain, rock musician David Crosby, German philosopher Friedrich Nietzsche, Polish politicians Józef Piłsudski and Lech Wałęsa, former professional hockey player Lanny McDonald, actor Stephen Fry, actor Sam Elliott and Soviet General Secretary Joseph Stalin, who at times also wore the handlebar moustache. Jamie Hyneman of MythBusters is also known for his walrus moustache, a common source of humor with his co-host Adam Savage.

See also 
 List of moustache styles
 List of facial hairstyles

References

External links
 

Moustache styles